Eisstadion Liebenau is an indoor sporting arena located in Graz, Austria, which for sponsorship reasons is currently called Merkur Eisstadion.  The capacity of the arena is 4,126 people and was built in 1963.  It is home to the EC Graz 99ers ice hockey team of the ICE Hockey League.

Photos

References

Indoor ice hockey venues in Austria
Sports venues in Styria
Buildings and structures in Graz
Graz 99ers